Jens Kroker (born 8 May 1969) is a German sailor from Hamburg. Who has competed in 5 Paralympics games winning both a gold and silver medal.

References

External links
 
 
 

Living people
1969 births
German disabled sportspeople
German male sailors (sport)
Sonar class world champions
Disabled sailing world champions
World champions in sailing for Germany
Paralympic sailors of Germany
Sailors at the 2000 Summer Paralympics
Sailors at the 2004 Summer Paralympics
Sailors at the 2008 Summer Paralympics
Sailors at the 2012 Summer Paralympics
Sailors at the 2016 Summer Paralympics
Medalists at the 2008 Summer Paralympics
Medalists at the 2012 Summer Paralympics
Paralympic medalists in sailing
Paralympic gold medalists for Germany
Paralympic silver medalists for Germany